Trudge may refer to:

Trudge, from list of Yu-Gi-Oh! 5D's characters
Trudge Valley, Antarctica
Trudge, 1989 album by Controlled Bleeding  
Trudge, 1985 EP by Savage Republic   
"Trudge", 2012 song by Dntel from Aimlessness